Mount Duval is a  mountain on Baffin Island, Nunavut, Canada.  It is on the Pangnirtung Fiord near Pangnirtung.

Notes 

Mountains of Baffin Island
Mountains of Canada under 1000 metres